Sexual harassment in education is an unwelcome behavior of a sexual nature that interferes with a student's ability to learn, study, work or participate in school activities. Sexual harassment encompasses a range of behavior from mild annoyances to sexual assault and rape. As committed by teachers, it is often framed as "sex for grades" and has attracted media attention throughout the world, partly in connection with the #MeToo movement.

United States

In the United States, sexual harassment is a form of discrimination under Title IX of the Education Amendments of 1972.

A Yale Law School article from 2016 offers a good primer on how to restore institutional liability to sexual harassment in education 

A section reads: Reporting sexual harassment to school administrations frequently becomes a distinctively damaging part of the abuse experience, termed “betrayal trauma,”90 by exacerbating and frequently exceeding the harms of the original assault. Students often identify with and trust—even love—their schools, and are dependent on them in many ways. Students frequently believe the institutions they dreamed of attending will identify with and want to help them. Uncovering and living through the slowly unfolding nightmare of its other agendas and higher priorities comes as a shock. It is remarkable how many accounts of sexual harassment in education focus on the school turning against the reporting student rather than on the sexual abuse itself. Many a student who begins the process believing in the beneficence and caring of their institution and its intentions is grievously, even viciously, disappointed.

The May 2020 revisions to title IX and the definition of sexual harassment are also a game changer for educators and past misconduct that is now considered sexual harassment.

Germany
The Universität Bremen was the first university in Germany to establish, in 1992, a contact point for matters regarding sexual harassment. It is generally considered that the power difference between university students and professors, who determine grades and can offer or prolong employment positions for PhD students, results in a risk of harassment. According to a non-representative survey of 12,663 students in 2012, every fourth student reported some form of sexual harassment, and about ten percent of those cases involved harassment by teachers. Concerned students who do not want to report misbehaviour for fear of career repercussions are given advice as to how to handle the situation. For example, a doctoral student may be advised to add an external evaluator to assess their work or to request that they be assigned a different advisor.

In the mid-2010s, allegations of sexual harassment were raised against teachers in institutions of higher education in Hamburg, Düsseldorf and Munich.

Ghana and Nigeria
BBC Africa Eye performed a year-long investigation into sexual harassment committed by university teachers in Ghana. Four academics were secretly filmed as part of the investigation. It involved undercover reporters posing as students at the University of Ghana and the University of Lagos. The resulting documentary was broadcast in October 2019, exposing the misconduct.

The African Feminist Initiative released a solidarity statement condemning the harassment in an institution that should offer a safe environment for learning.

Two academics were suspended from the University of Ghana for six months and four months, respectively, without salary. They were to undergo training about the university's sexual harassment and misconduct policy, to resume work only after a positive assessment, and to undergo an annual assessment for five years. Some have criticized the punishment as too lenient.

In 2020, Nigeria's Senate initiated the debate of a bill aiming to prevent the sexual harassment of university students.

See also
Sexual abuse in primary and secondary schools
Child-on-child sexual abuse
School-related gender-based violence (SRGBV)
Sexual bullying

References

External links and further reading
Hey, Shorty!: A Guide to Combating Sexual Harassment and Violence in Schools and on the Streets (2011)
Crossing the Line (2011)

Academia
Education issues
Child sexual abuse
Sexual harassment